Henry Vernon Gregory (born 18 January 1936) is a former English cricketer.  Gregory was a right-handed batsman who bowled leg break.  He was born at Manchester, Lancashire.

Gregory made a single Minor Counties Championship appearance for Cheshire against the Warwickshire Second XI.  He later made a single first-class appearance for Sussex against Cambridge University at Fenner's in 1960.  He was dismissed for 4 runs in Sussex's first-innings by Alan Hurd, while in their second-innings, he was dismissed for 14 runs by Michael Willard.  Cambridge University won the match by 4 wickets.  This was his only major appearance for Sussex.

References

External links
Henry Gregory at ESPNcricinfo
Henry Gregory at CricketArchive

1936 births
Living people
Cricketers from Manchester
English cricketers
Cheshire cricketers
Sussex cricketers